Oleksandr Volodymyrovych Obolonchyk (born 17 January 1992 in Kremenets) is a Ukrainian luger. He participated at the 2014 and 2018 Winter Olympics.

Career
Obolonczyk started his international career in 2009 competing in singles. He debuted finishing 60th in Igls, Austria, which was his single race in World Cup that year.

In season 2010-11 he participated in 6 out of 9 races and achieved his personal best - 27th in Königssee. Two more seasons he competed in singles but later he switched to doubles. Roman Zakharkiv is since then his partner.

Obolonchyk competed at the 2014 Winter Olympics for Ukraine. In the doubles he competed with Roman Zakharkiv, finishing 17th. He was also a part of the Ukrainian relay team, which finished 11th.

He also participated in doubles and relay competitions at three World Championships without any great success.

As of January 2018, his best finish is 13th place in Sigulda, Latvia, in 2016-17 season.

On December 27, 2017, Obolonchyk qualified for 2018 Winter Olympics. At that Games he competed together with Roman Zakharkiv and finished 20th in doubles competition and 13th in team relay.

Personal life
Obolonchyk graduated from Lviv State University of Physical Culture. Now he studies at Ternopil State Economics University. His hobbies are computer and music.

Career results

Winter Olympics

World Championships

European Championships

Luge World Cup

Rankings

References

External links
 

1992 births
Living people
Ukrainian male lugers
Lugers at the 2014 Winter Olympics
Lugers at the 2018 Winter Olympics
Olympic lugers of Ukraine
People from Kremenets
Sportspeople from Ternopil Oblast